My Universe in Lower Case is a 2011 Mexican drama film directed by Hatuey Viveros. It was screened at the International Film Festival of Kerala.

Cast
 Moises Arizmendi as Empleado Banco
 Diana Bracho as Josefina
 Sonia Couoh as Karina
 Eugenia de la O as Gloria
 Aida Folch as Aina
 Dagoberto Gama as Jardinero
 Enoc Leaño as Cliente Tacos
 Tara Parra as Elba

References

External links
 

2011 films
2011 drama films
Mexican drama films
2010s Spanish-language films
2011 directorial debut films
2010s Mexican films